The Gang of Four was a quantified and common colloquial implicit term for a set of four military leaders in the Pakistan military who were central figures in the military dictatorship in Pakistan wherein generals and admirals of the Pakistan Armed Forces had control over the country. This specific quantified set was briefed in the classified intelligence matters by the executive branches of the government. It was first related to the President General Zia-ul-Haq, and staffers of his administration including General Akhtar Rahman, Khalid Mahmud Arif, and Zahid Ali Akbar.

According to the military authors, these four generals were responsible on staging a military  coup ďètat against Prime Minister Zulfikar Ali Bhutto in 1977. The term was popularized by Benazir Bhutto (1953-2007) in 1980s in political science sphere of Pakistan. 

In 1999 and also in 2013, the term was used by military authors of Kargil War, implicating mastermind of Kargil misadventure and staging military coup d'état against Prime Minister Nawaz Sharif in 1999. The term used to relate General Pervez Musharraf's four generals who staged the coup; General Ehsan ul Haq, General Aziz Khan, Mahmood Ahmad and Shahid Aziz; all four were the generals in Pakistan Army, first instrumental of launching the Kargil war and then staging a coup against Nawaz Sharif in 1999.

Notes

 Military government of Pakistan (1977–1988)
Political terminology in Pakistan
 History of political thought
 Military terminology of Pakistan
 Government of Pakistan secrecy